The Tyrrell 007 is a Formula One racing car, designed by Tyrrell's Chief Designer, Derek Gardner.

Development
Ken Tyrrell, owner of Tyrrell Racing needed two new drivers for  because Jackie Stewart retired from driving at the end of 1973 and François Cevert was killed at the 1973 season finale in the United States. The team had originally  planned to have Cevert and Jody Scheckter as their driver line up for 1974. Following Cevert's death, Tyrrell signed Patrick Depailler as replacement. In the first three races of 1974, (Argentina, Brazil and South Africa), Tyrrell used the earlier 005 and 006 chassis.

Racing history

Elf Team Tyrrell

1974
The Tyrrell 007 made its debut at the Spanish Grand Prix. Scheckter drove the 007 and finished fifth, Depailler raced the 006 and the 005 was no longer used. Two 007s raced at Belgium. At the start of the race, Clay Regazzoni's Ferrari took the lead ahead of Scheckter and Emerson Fittipaldi's McLaren. At the end of the first lap Fittipaldi passed Scheckter to take second place. At the Swedish Grand Prix, Scheckter won the race and Depailler finished second. At the Dutch Grand Prix Scheckter finished fifth and Depailler sixth. At the French Grand Prix, Scheckter took fourth and Depailler finished eighth in the 006. In the British Grand Prix Scheckter took the lead and won the race, engine failure took Depailler out of the race. In Germany, Depailler through an accident caused by broken suspension. At the Austrian Grand Prix Depailler retired after an accident. Peterson crossed the line less than a second ahead of Fittipaldi after 12 laps of battling in Italy. Scheckter finished third and Depailler finished eleventh.

The Tyrrell team scored 52 World Championship points; four points were scored by the 005 and the 007 scored 48 points, earning them third place in the Constructors' Championship standings.

1975

The Tyrrell team scored twenty five World Championship points, earning them fifth place in the Constructors' Championship standings.

1976

The Tyrrell team scored 71 World Championship points, 13 points were scored by the 007 and the Tyrrell P34 scored 58 points, earning them third place in the Constructors' Championship standings.

Complete Formula One World Championship results

(key) (Races in bold indicate pole position; results in italics indicate fastest lap)

 4 points in  scored using the Tyrrell 005.   58 points in  scored using the Tyrrell P34.   All points in  scored using the Tyrrell P34.

Non-Championship results
(key) (results in italics indicate fastest lap)

References

Tyrrell Formula One cars